USS Champion (MCM-4), an  mine countermeasures ship, is the fourth U.S. Navy ship of that name.

Champion was laid down on 28 June 1984 at Marinette Marine Corporation, Marinette, Wisconsin; launched on 15 April 1989; and commissioned on 8 February 1991. She was assigned to the Active Naval Reserve, Mine Countermeasures Squadron Two, US Atlantic Fleet.

While on a five-month deployment in the Mediterranean during 1999, Champion assisted in the evacuation of ethnic Albanians from war-torn Kosovo.

Champion was the recipient of the 2004 Environmental Quality Small Ship Award sponsored by the Environmental Readiness Division of the Chief of Naval Operations .

Champion was decommissioned on 25 August 2020.

References

External links
 Official page

Champion (MCM-4) at NavSource
Champion (MCM-4) at US Carriers
Undersea Partners – The Mine Countermeasures Surface Force

 

Avenger-class mine countermeasures ships
Ships built by Marinette Marine
1989 ships
Minehunters of the United States